Thebephatshwa Airport  is an airport serving Molepolole, in the Kweneng District of Botswana.

Maparangwane Air Base

The main base has a hangar for larger aircraft and helicopter hangar located to the northeast end of the runway.

The airport also serves as one of three Botswana Defence Force Air Wing air bases. The air base is home to:

Z1 Transport Squadron
Z7 Training Squadron
Z10 Transport Squadron
Z21 Transport/Helicopter Squadron
Z23 Transport/Helicopter Squadron
Z28 Fighter Squadron

The airbase is also home to the Thebephatshwa Airbase Hospital, with two helipads.

See also

Transport in Botswana
List of airports in Botswana

References

External links 
OpenStreetMap - Thebephatshwa
OurAirports - Thebephatshwa
SkyVector - Thebephatshwa

Airports in Botswana
Kweneng District